Holly Munro (born 22 July 1998) is a Welsh international field hockey player who plays as a defender for Wales and was in the Great Britain senior squad for the 2019 FIH Pro League.
She made her international debut in 2022 against South Africa. She also appeared at the Commonwealth Games for Wales in 2022. 

She plays club hockey in the Women's England Hockey League Premier Division for Clifton Robinsons.

Munro previously played for Surbiton and Uni of Birmingham.
 
She first played hockey for Richmond Hockey Club and then played for Surbiton.

She has a brother named Jack, who played in the 150th Open Qualifying for golf and went to St. Andrews University.

References

1998 births
Living people
English female field hockey players
Women's England Hockey League players
Surbiton Hockey Club players